Chemtrails over the Country Club is the seventh studio album by American singer-songwriter Lana Del Rey. It was released on March 19, 2021, by Interscope and Polydor Records. After working with him on her previous studio album, Norman Fucking Rockwell! (2019), Del Rey enlisted producer Jack Antonoff as her co-producer for the majority of the album, while previous collaborator Rick Nowels produced one of the album's tracks. The album features collaborations with Nikki Lane, Weyes Blood, and Zella Day. 

Chemtrails over the Country Club is described as a folk, country folk, and Americana record. According to Del Rey, the album is about her friends and family. Other themes featured on the album are themes of escapism, love, heartbreak, and nostalgia, while encompassing her usual references to Americana, alongside emotions of disillusionment.

Chemtrails over the Country Club received acclaim from music critics, with many comparing its sound to its predecessor. The album debuted at number one in eight countries, including the United Kingdom, becoming Del Rey's fifth number one album in the country, and reached the top 5 in twenty countries, including the United States, where it peaked at number two on the Billboard 200, becoming Del Rey's sixth consecutive top five album in the country.

Background 
Del Rey first announced the album in an interview with Time on August 30, 2019, the release of her sixth studio album, Norman Fucking Rockwell!. Originally titled White Hot Forever, it was slated for a 2020 release, with Del Rey saying that the album would be released "sometime within the next 12 or 13 months". On May 25, 2020, the album's final title was revealed to be Chemtrails over the Country Club, scheduled for a September 5, 2020 release. After the release of her debut book, Violet Bent Backwards over the Grass in 2020, Del Rey held a book signing, where she revealed that the album had been postponed due to vinyl record production delays caused by the COVID-19 pandemic. Additionally, she revealed the title of the song "Dealer", revealing that she was uncertain about including it on the album. "Dealer" would not be included on Chemtrails over the Country Club, but eventually appeared on its follow-up Blue Banisters (2021).

On August 7, 2020, Del Rey posted a video on Instagram featuring a snippet of the track "Tulsa Jesus Freak", which would later be included on the album. On September 1, Del Rey posted a video on Instagram of herself on the set of the music video for the album title track, and announced that the album's lead single would be the song "Let Me Love You like a Woman", further stating the album would be released "soon" after.

Music and lyrics 
Chemtrails over the Country Club is described as a folk, country folk, and Americana record. The majority of the album was co-produced by Del Rey, alongside Jack Antonoff who is also the sole producer of the album's lead single, "Let Me Love You like a Woman". The song "Yosemite", which was recorded during the sessions for Del Rey's fifth studio album, Lust For Life (2017), held between 2015 and 2016, was produced by Rick Nowles. the song failed to be included on Lust For Life, because, according to Del Rey, "the song was too happy; we're not there yet."

Del Rey stated "so much of the album" pertains to her "stunning girlfriends" and "beautiful siblings". She further added that, "In 2021, [Chemtrails over the Country Club] opens a sunnier chapter in [Del Rey's] controversial roman-à-clef, and folk legend Joan Baez advocates her acceptance in the pantheon", adding that the album "appears to reveal a more vulnerable Del Rey" who is "lighter on the LA menace" and "more innocently emotional" than in her previous work.

The song "Breaking Up Slowly" features an uncredited guest appearance by American singer Nikki Lane, who also co-wrote the song with Del Rey. The album's closes with a cover of Joni Mitchell's "For Free" from her album Ladies of the Canyon (1970). American singers Weyes Blood and Zella Day join Del Rey on the song.

Cover artwork 
On January 10, 2021, a day prior to the release of its title track, Del Rey revealed the album cover and track list of Chemtrails over the Country Club on Twitter and Instagram. The cover shows Del Rey with a number of her female friends (who also appear in the title track's music video). On January 11, retail chains Target and HMV revealed exclusive editions of the record featuring alternate cover art—a portrait photograph by Neil Krug.

Release and promotion 

On October 16, 2020, "Let Me Love You Like a Woman" was released alongside its music video as the album's lead single. Del Rey performed the song for the first time on The Tonight Show Starring Jimmy Fallon on December 14, 2020. The performance, which was pre-recorded, was her first televised performance in nine years, since her infamous appearance on Saturday Night Live in 2012. She performed the song again, as well as a rendition of "Silent Night" on at Jack Antonoff's Ally Coalition Talent Show on December 21. The following day, she posted a teaser video for the album's title track on her social media platforms, announcing its release as the second single on January 11, 2021, alongside the album's pre-order. Chemtrails over the Country Club was released worldwide on March 19, 2021. Two more singles were released from the album. The songs "White Dress" and "Tulsa Jesus Freak" were released as the album's third and fourth singles respectively on March 26, 2021.

Critical reception 

Chemtrails over the Country Club received acclaim from music critics. At Metacritic, which assigns a normalized rating out of 100 to reviews from mainstream publications, the album received an average score of 81 based on 28 reviews, indicating "universal acclaim". At AnyDecentMusic?, which collects critical reviews from more than 50 media sources, the album scored 7.8 points out of 10, based on 29 reviews.

AllMusic Fred Thomas stated Del Rey "shakes off the cocoon of her slick pop days completely" in Chemtrails over the Country Club, carrying on the nuanced songwriting of Norman Fucking Rockwell! and ensuing in her "most atmospheric" album to-date. Will Hodgkinson of The Times called the album both "beautifully executed" and "thoughtfully realised". Los Angeles Times critic Mikael Wood found Del Rey's singing reaching a "new peak" in Chemtrails; he pinpointed how her vocals move "between her airy head voice and her sultry chest voice". Rhian Daly of NME called the album "a sublime statement" that mediates on fame and romance, having the singer "at the peak of her game". Reviewing for The Independent, Helen Brown named Del Rey "a great storyteller", who consistently details "the who, what, where and when". Brown wrote that the album tones down the "lush orchestration" of its predecessor, opting for more acoustic guitar-picking, supported by "scuffs of scuzzy electric guitar and trip-hoppy hotel lobby organ".

Liam Inscoe-Jones of The Line of Best Fit complimented the album's "gorgeous" instrumentation and Del Rey's story-based songwriting. Praising the album's writing, The Observer critic Kitty Empire described it as "a record chockful of beauty and thoughtful autobiography that only a more experienced, more assured songwriter could have made". Branding it "an enchanting listen" and a "bewitching project", Clash Robin Murray lauded the album's minimal instrumentation and the world-building of its lyrics. John Amen of PopMatters wrote, "Chemtrails makes use of a more minimal and nuanced palette than earlier albums, Del Rey distancing herself, throughout the set and to varying degrees, from her longstanding persona and familiar stylistics. In this way, she avoids collapsing into formulas or self-caricature, continuing to explore new aesthetic possibilities."

In mixed reviews, Tim Sentz, writing for Beats Per Minute, stated Chemtrails is nowhere near as sonically versatile as its predecessor and is "a coffeehouse-appropriate album that contains almost none of what made her last album transcend". Spin critic Bobby Olivier favored the "several gorgeous arrangements" of the album but felt the music is less memorable than the rest of her catalogue. He found the country and folk inspired sound "sometimes striking", but the lyrics were "uninspired" at moments. Alexis Petridis of The Guardian thought the album centers heavily on Del Rey's recurrent themes of "nostalgia, troubled fame and ne'er-do-well lovers", but appreciated the melodies of its tracks. The A.V. Club Tatiana Tenreyro dubbed Chemtrails a sonically and lyrically inferior record to Norman Fucking Rockwell!, commenting that most of its tracks "don't stand out" and "blend together in their delicateness". Johnny of the Well, reviewing for Sputnikmusic, criticized the album's "clumsy writing, bland instrumentation, vacuous sentimentalism and hamfisted stylisation"; nevertheless, he picked "Tulsa Jesus Freak" as a highlight.

Year-end lists

Commercial performance 
Chemtrails over the Country Club debuted at number two on the US Billboard 200 chart, earning 75,000 album-equivalent units, (including 58,000 copies in pure album sales) in its first week, according to MRC Data, blocked by the top spot by Justin Bieber's Justice becoming Del Rey's seventh US top ten debut on the chart. The album became her third chart-topper on the US Top Album Sales list, scoring the fourth-largest sales week for a vinyl album since MRC Data began tracking sales in 1991, with nearly 32,000 copies sold. In addition, the album accumulated a total of 21.19 million on-demand streams from the album’s songs.

In the United Kingdom, Chemtrails over the Country Club debuted at number one on the UK Albums Chart, selling 40,000 copies in its first week and outselling the rest of the top 10 combined, becoming Del Rey's fifth UK number-one album. The album became the fastest-selling vinyl of the century for a female act in the UK, with 16,700 vinyl copies sold. In its first three days in the United Kingdom, the album sold 30,566 physical copies. In August 2021, the album was certified Silver by the British Phonographic Industry (BPI) for earning over 60,000 album-equivalent units in the UK.

Track listing

Personnel 

Musicians
 Lana Del Rey – vocals
 Jack Antonoff – piano , guitar , bass , drums , Mellotron , keyboards , twelve-string acoustic guitar , synthesizers , Model B synth-bass , percussion , acoustic guitar , electric guitar , slide guitar , Hammond B3 , programming , organ , Rhodes 
 Daniel Heath – strings 
 Evan Smith – horns , accordion 
 Rick Nowels – acoustic guitar , keyboards , Mellotron , bass 
 Aaron Sterling – drums , percussion 
 Trevor Yasuda – sound effects 
 Nikki Lane – additional vocals 
 Mikey Freedom Hart – pedal steel , piano , guitar , Mellotron 
 Weyes Blood – additional vocals 
 Zella Day – additional vocals 

Producers and engineers
 Jack Antonoff – production , mixing 
 Lana Del Rey – production 
 Rick Nowels – production 
 Laura Sisk – engineering , mixing 
 Kieron Menzies – engineering , mixing 
 Dean Reid – engineering , mixing 
 Trevor Yasuda – engineering 
 John Fee – engineering 
 John Rooney – engineering assistance 
 Jon Sher – engineering assistance 
 Chris Gehringer – mastering
 Will Quinnell – mastering assistance

Charts

Weekly charts

Year-end charts

Certifications

Notes

References 

Lana Del Rey albums
2021 albums
Albums produced by Jack Antonoff
Albums produced by Rick Nowels
Albums recorded at Electric Lady Studios
Interscope Records albums
Polydor Records albums
Album chart usages for Greece
Albums postponed due to the COVID-19 pandemic
Americana albums
Country albums by American artists
Country folk albums
Folk albums by American artists